The Web Content Accessibility Guidelines (WCAG) are part of a series of web accessibility guidelines published by the Web Accessibility Initiative (WAI) of the World Wide Web Consortium (W3C), the main international standards organization for the Internet. They are a set of recommendations for making Web content more accessible, primarily for people with disabilities—but also for all user agents, including highly limited devices, such as mobile phones. WCAG 2.0, were published in December 2008 and became an ISO standard, ISO/IEC 40500:2012 in October 2012. WCAG 2.1 became a W3C Recommendation in June 2018.



History

Earlier guidelines (1995–1998) 
The first web accessibility guideline was compiled by Gregg Vanderheiden and released in January 1995, just after the 1994 Second International Conference on the World-Wide Web (WWW II) in Chicago (where Tim Berners-Lee first mentioned disability access in a keynote speech after seeing a pre-conference workshop on accessibility led by Mike Paciello).

Over 38 different Web access guidelines followed from various authors and organizations over the next few years. These were brought together in the Unified Web Site Accessibility Guidelines compiled at the University of Wisconsin–Madison.
Version 8 of the Unified Web Site Accessibility Guidelines, published in 1998, served as the starting point for the W3C's WCAG 1.0.

Version 1 (1999–2000)
The WCAG 1.0 were published and became a W3C recommendation on 5 May 1999. In February 2008, The WCAG Samurai, a group of developers independent of the W3C, and led by Joe Clark, published corrections for, and extensions to, the WCAG 1.0.

Version 2 (2001–present) 
The first concept proposal of WCAG 2.0 was published on 25 January 2001. In the following years new versions were published intended to solicit feedback from accessibility experts and members of the disability community. On 27 April 2006 a "Last Call Working Draft" was published. Due to the many amendments that were necessary, WCAG 2.0 were published again as a concept proposal on 17 May 2007, followed by a second "Last Call Working Draft" on 11 December 2007. In April 2008 the guidelines became a "Candidate Recommendation". On 3 November 2008 the guidelines became a "Proposed Recommendation". WCAG 2.0 were published as a W3C Recommendation on 11 December 2008. In October 2012, WCAG 2.0 were accepted by the International Organization for Standardization as an ISO International Standard, ISO/IEC 40500:2012. In early 2014, WCAG 2.0's Level A and Level AA success criteria were incorporated as references in clause 9.2 ("Web content requirements") of the European standard EN 301 549 published by ETSI. EN 301 549 was produced in response to a mandate that the European Commission gave to the three official European standardisation bodies (CEN, CENELEC and ETSI) and is the first European standard for ICT products and services.

WCAG 2.1 became a W3C Recommendation on 5 June 2018.

As of September 2022, WCAG 2.2 is a W3C candidate recommendation snapshot, and is scheduled to be finalized within 2022.

Version 3 (under development)
In early 2021, the Accessibility Guidelines Working Group presented the first public working draft (FPWD) of the future WCAG 3.0, intended to provide a range of recommendations for making web content more accessible. The 2021 FPWD introduced a new color contrast method as part of WCAG 3.0, as a candidate to replace the existing WCAG 2.x contrast specification, called the Accessible Perceptual Contrast Algorithm (APCA), which is currently being beta tested. It should be made clear that no part of WCAG 3.0 is an official recommendation. WCAG 3.0 is a draft undergoing significant development efforts, and the expected release date as an official recommendation is not defined.

Versions

Version 1
WCAG 1.0 consist of 14 guidelines—each of which describes a general principle of accessible design. Each guideline covers a basic theme of web accessibility and is associated with one or more checkpoints that describes how to apply that guideline to particular webpage features.

 Guideline 1: Provide equivalent alternatives to auditory and visual content 
 Guideline 2: Don't rely on colour alone
 Guideline 3: Use markup and style sheets, and do so properly
 Guideline 4: Clarify natural language usage
 Guideline 5: Create tables that transform gracefully
 Guideline 6: Ensure that pages featuring new technologies transform gracefully
 Guideline 7: Ensure user control of time sensitive content changes
 Guideline 8: Ensure direct accessibility of embedded user interfaces
 Guideline 9: Design for device independence
 Guideline 10: User interim solutions
 Guideline 11: Use W3C technologies and guidelines
 Guideline 12: Provide context and orientation information
 Guideline 13: Provide clear navigation mechanisms
 Guideline 14: Ensure that documents are clear and simple

Each of the in total 65 WCAG 1.0 checkpoints has an assigned priority level based on the checkpoint's impact on accessibility:

 Priority 1: Web developers must satisfy these requirements, otherwise it will be impossible for one or more groups to access the Web content. Conformance to this level is described as A.
 Priority 2: Web developers should satisfy these requirements, otherwise some groups will find it difficult to access the Web content. Conformance to this level is described as AA or Double-A.
 Priority 3: Web developers may satisfy these requirements to make it easier for some groups to access the Web content. Conformance to this level is described as AAA or Triple-A.

Version 2
WCAG 2.0 consist of twelve guidelines organized under four principles (websites must be perceivable, operable, understandable, and robust). Each guideline has testable success criteria (61 in all). The W3C's Techniques for WCAG 2.0 is a list of techniques that help authors meet the guidelines and success criteria. The techniques are periodically updated whereas the principles, guidelines and success criteria are stable and do not change. WCAG 2.0 uses the same three levels of conformance (A, AA, AAA) as WCAG 1.0, but has redefined them. The WCAG working group maintains an extensive list of web accessibility techniques and common failure cases for WCAG 2.0.

WCAG 2.1 is backwards-compatible with WCAG 2.0, which it extends with a further 17 success criteria.

WCAG referenced by law 
This section only refers to specific instances where WCAG, or a closely related derivative thereof, is specifically codified into law. There are many laws relating to accessibility in general and which may apply to websites, though they don't necessarily refer to WCAG. It is nevertheless considered prudent to follow WCAG guidelines to help protect against potential lawsuits relating to accessibility.

United States 
In 2013, the US Department of Transportation amended the Air Carrier Access Act (ACAA) to require Airlines make their Websites accessible, requiring conformance to WCAG 2.0, meeting Level AA Success Criteria. 

In January 2017, the US Access Board approved a final rule to update Section 508 of the Rehabilitation Act of 1973. The new rule adopts seventeen WCAG 2.0 success criteria, but 22 of the 38 existing A-level and AA-level criteria were already covered by existing Section 508 guidelines. The rule requires adherence to the new standards twelve months from its date of publication in the federal register.

In December, 2021 the 11th circuit court vacated a sometimes-cited case from 2017, which had referred to the WCAG guidelines as "industry standard". The 11th circuit court's ruling rendered the 2017 case moot. As such, the case is no longer citable as caselaw. On March 2, 2022, the 11th circuit court refused to rehear the case.

European Union 

Directive 2016/2102 requires websites and mobile applications of public sector (i.e. government) bodies to conform to WCAG 2.1 Level AA. As of June 2021, the directive covers websites and mobile apps. The European Parliament approved the directive in October 2016, the European Commission updated the WCAG reference from 2.0 to 2.1 in December 2018.

United Kingdom 

In September 2018, website and mobile app accessibility regulations for the public sector came into force, titled  the Public Sector Bodies (Websites and Mobile Applications) Accessibility Regulations 2018, which currently applies the WCAG 2.1 AA level to websites operated by the "public sector", which means government agencies or organizations funded by the government, with some exclusions. The UK government published Understanding accessibility requirements for public sector bodies to guide compliance.

Canada 

Regulations under the Accessibility for Ontarians with Disabilities Act, 2005 require that public web content of certain Ontario organizations complies with WCAG 2.0 Level AA.

The 2010/2012 Jodhan decision caused the Canadian federal government to require all online web pages, documents and videos available externally and internally to meet the accessibility requirements of WCAG 2.0.

Australia 

The Australian government has also mandated via the Disability Discrimination Act 1992 that all Australian government websites meet the WCAG 2.0 level A accessibility requirements.

Israel 

The Israeli Ministry of Justice published regulations in early 2014, requiring Internet websites to comply with Israeli Standard 5568, which is based on the W3C Web Content Accessibility Guidelines 2.0.

The main differences between the Israeli standard and the W3C standard concern the requirements to provide captions and texts for audio and video media. The Israeli standards are somewhat more lenient, reflecting the current technical difficulties in providing such captions and texts in Hebrew.

References

External links 

 W3C – Web Content Accessibility Guidelines (WCAG) 2.1
 W3C – Web Accessibility Initiative (WAI) introduction to WCAG
 Mauve, an accessibility validator developed by HIIS Lab – ISTI of CNR of Pisa (Italy).
 WAVE – Online accessibility validator
 WCAG 2.0 checklist
 Achieving WCAG 2.0 with PDF/UA – Document published by the Association for Information and Image Management (AIIM)
 WCAG for eLearning - Training Accessibility Guidelines
 Digital Accessibility WCAG AA Checklist: 10 Critical Elements to Evaluate for Website Accessibility
 WCAG Samurai Errata
 The History of Digital Accessibility and Why it Matters

Web accessibility
Game accessibility
ISO standards